The microwave heat distribution is the distribution (allocation) of the heat release inside the microwave absorptive material irradiated with high intensive microwaves.
The  pattern of microwave heat distribution depends on many physical parameters, which may include the electromagnetic field, the specific absorption rate and structure of the processed material, the geometrical dimensions of the processing cavity, etc.
Most of the industrial microwave heating applications need a uniform heat distribution.
For example, the uniformity of microwave heat distribution is key parameter in microwave food sterilization, due to the potential danger directly related to human health if the food has not been heated evenly up to desirable temperature for neutralization of possible bacteria population.
There are many different methods for achieving uniform heat distribution inside the irradiated material. They may involve computer simulation and different mechanical mechanisms such as turntables and stirrers.
The proper microwave energy pattern is necessary for attaining a uniform heat release.

See also
Susceptor
Electromagnetic-Temperature Control & Optimization of Microwave Thermal Processing

A hybrid technique for computing the power distribution generated in a lossy medium during microwave heating

References
Microwave processing of Materials, National Research Council, Publication NMAB-473, Washington, DC, 1994

J. Chang, and M. Brodwin, “A new applicator for efficient uniform heating using a circular cylindrical geometry,” J. Microwave Power & Electromagnetic Energy, vol. 28, pp. 32–40, March 1993

External links
 Microwave heat distribution visualization

Electric and magnetic fields in matter